Avril Walker (born 8 May 1954) is a British luger. She competed in the women's singles event at the 1980 Winter Olympics.

References

External links
 

1954 births
Living people
British female lugers
Olympic lugers of Great Britain
Lugers at the 1980 Winter Olympics
Place of birth missing (living people)